Hellinsia fissuripuncta is a moth of the family Pterophoridae. It is found in Costa Rica.

Adults are on wing in January, March and April.

References

Moths described in 1999
fissuripuncta
Moths of Central America